WKFM is an FM radio station licensed to Huron, Ohio, operating on 96.1 MHz. Its transmitter is in Berlin Heights and its studios are in Milan, along with sister stations WLKR-FM and WLKR (AM). The station is locally owned by Elyria-Lorain Broadcasting Co., and features a Country format positioned on-air as "K-96." Programming is a combination of local hosts and Dial Global's Mainstream Country satellite format.

WKFM serves the Sandusky/Port Clinton/Lake Erie Islands (Vacationland) region.

While at first it was only a satellite-fed signal (carrying Westwood One's satellite country channel), this is now only the case outside drive time and at weekends. The station is also an affiliate of NASCAR programming.

References

External links

KFM
Country radio stations in the United States
Radio stations established in 1995